Emma Jill Appleton is an English actress and model. She starred in the Channel 4 spy thriller Traitors (2019) and the BBC adaptation of Everything I Know About Love (2022). She also appeared in the BBC Three thriller Clique (2017), the Netflix fantasy series The Witcher (2019), and the Hulu miniseries Pistol (2022).

Early life and education
Emma Jill Appleton was born and raised in Witney, Oxfordshire. She attended West Witney Primary School and then Wood Green School. Appleton was interested in drama from a young age and participated in it at school.

Career
Appleton began her career in modeling as a teenager, appearing in gigs for Victoria Beckham, The Kooples, Margaret Howell and DAKS, and advertising brands such as Fred Perry, Toni & Guy, Rimmel, and Converse. 

Appleton went into acting in 2016 when she appeared as Pixie in the short film Dreamlands. This was followed by her television debut with a recurring role as Fay Brookstone in the first series of the BBC Three thriller Clique. She also made guest appearances in the first series of the Channel 4 comedy-drama The End of the F***ing World and an episode of the ITV detective drama Grantchester.
 
In 2018, she appeared in two episodes of the National Geographic anthology Genius, about Picasso, who was played by Antonio Banderas.

In 2019, Appleton was cast in her first lead role as Feef Symonds in the Channel 4 spy thriller Traitors. Later that year, Appleton played Princess Renfri in the first season of the Netflix fantasy series The Witcher. Appleton made her feature film debut in the 2021 romantic drama The Last Letter from Your Lover, also on Netflix. She guest starred as Mya Miller in two episodes of the Sky One science fiction series Intergalactic.

In 2022, Appleton portrayed Nancy Spungen in the Hulu biographical miniseries Pistol, starred alongside Bel Powley in the BBC adaptation of Dolly Alderton's Everything I Know About Love. The same year, Appleton had her first lead film role as Thomasina in LOLA along with Stefanie Martini.

In 2023, Appleton has an upcoming role in the Paramount+ legal thriller The Killing Kind opposite Colin Morgan.

Filmography

Film

Television

References

External links

Emma Appleton Instagram

Living people
21st-century English actresses
Actresses from Oxfordshire
English female models
English film actresses
English television actresses
People from Witney
Year of birth missing (living people)
21st-century English women